The 1946 Midwest Conference football season was the season of college football played by the nine member schools of the Midwest Conference (MWC), formally known as the "Midwest Collegiate Athletic Conference", as part of the 1946 college football season.

The Lawrence Vikings, in their ninth season under head coach Bernie Heselton, won the MWC championship with a 6–1–1 record (6–0 against MWC opponents). Back Carl Giordana and tackle Richard Miller received first-team honors on the 1946 All-Midwest Conference football team.

The Ripon Redmen, led by head coach Carl Doehling, finished in second place with a 4–3–1 record (3–1 against MWC teams). Ripon back Ted Scalissi and guard James Callan were selected as first-team All-MWC players.

The third-place Cornell Rams compiled a 5–2–1 record and led all other teams with three players (end Charles Jacot, guard Joe Pelisek, and center Ralph Ringgenberg) selected to the All-MWC first team.

Conference overview

Teams

Lawrence

The 1946 Lawrence Vikings football team represented Lawrence College (later renamed Lawrence University). In their ninth year under head coach Bernie Heselton, the Vikings compiled a 6–1–1 record (6–0 against MWC teams), won the MCAC championship, and outscored opponents by a total of 217 to 78.

Five Lawrence players received honors on the 1946 All-Midwest Conference football team: back Carl Giordana (first team); tackle Richard Miller (first team); tackle Kenneth Bahnson (second team); guard Bob McMaster (second); and end Bill Burton (second).

The team played its home games at Whiting Field in Appleton, Wisconsin.

Ripon

The 1946 Ripon Redmen football team represented Ripon College of Ripon, Wisconsin. In their 25th year under head coach Carl Doehling, the Redmen compiled a 4–3–1 record (3–1 against MWC teams), finished in second place in the MWC, and were outscored by a total of 131 to 109.

Cornell

The 1946 Cornell Rams football team represented Cornell College of Mount Vernon, Iowa. Led by head coach Walt S. Koch, the Rams compiled a 5–2–1 record (4–2 against MWC teams), finished in third place in the MWC, and outscored opponents by a total of 98 to 52.

Carleton

The 1946 Carleton Carls football team represented Carleton College of Northfield, Minnesota. Led by head coach Walter Hass, the Carls compiled a 5–3 record (3–2 against MWC teams), finished in fourth place in the MWC, and outscored opponents by a total of 131 to 79.

Monmouth

The 1946 Monmouth Fighting Scots football team represented Monmouth College of Monmouth, Illinois. Led by head coach Glenn E. Robinson, the Fighting Scots compiled a 4–4 record (2–3 against MWC teams), finished in fifth place in the MWC, and outscored opponents by a total of 104 to 66.

Grinnell

The 1946 Grinnell Pioneers football team represented Grinnell College of Grinnell, Iowa. In their third, non-consecutive year under head coach Ben Douglas, the Pioneers compiled a 3–5 record (2–4 against MWC teams), finished in a tie for sixth place in the MWC, and were outscored by a total of 87 to 82.

Grinnell also celebrated the school's centennial in the fall of 1946.

Beloit

The 1946 Beloit Buccaneers football team represented Beloit College of Beloit, Wisconsin. Led by head coach James C. Easterbrook, the Buccaneers compiled a 4–4 record (2–4 against MWC teams), finished in a tie for sixth place in the MWC, and were outscored by a total of 89 to 88.

The candidates for the 1946 Beloit football team included 50 veterans of World War II.

Knox

The 1946 Knox Old Siwash football team represented Knox College of Galesburg, Illinois. Led by head coach Harold Turner, the Old Siwash compiled a 3–5 record (2–4 against MWC teams), finished in a tie for sixth place in the MWC, and were outscored by a total of 95 to 45.

Coe

The 1946 Coe Kohawks football team represented Coe College of Cedar Rapids, Iowa. In their second season under head coach Harris Lamb, the Kohawks compiled a 3–5 record (1–5 against MWC teams), finished in last place in the MWC, and were outscored by a total of 119 to 30.

All-conference team
The 1946 All-Midwest Conference football team included the following players who were named to the first team:

First team
 Backs: Ted Scalissi, Ripon; Carl Giordana, Lawrence; Jeptha Knox, Carleton; Kermit Steinbeck, Grinnell
 Ends: Charles Jacot, Cornell; Mel White, Grinnell
 Tackles: Don Janssen, Beloit; Richard Miller, Lawrence
 Guards: James Callan, Ripon; Joe Pelisek, Cornell
 Center: Ralph Ringgenberg, Cornell

References